The Ministry for Internal Affairs (Министерство внутренних дел по Республике Северная Осетия – Алания) is the main law enforcement organ in North Ossetia–Alania in south Russia.

Current minister is Artur Akhmetkhanov (since December 2008). One of the known ministers in North Ossetia–Alania, was Kazbek Dzantiev (1996-2004).

External links
Official Website in Russian

Politics of North Ossetia–Alania
North Ossetia–Alania
North Ossetia-Alania